The Levillain-Letton House is a historic house located in Venice, Florida.

Description and history 

It is a 2-story Mediterranean Revival style house constructed of textured stucco over clay tile. The four bay plan is rectangular with a one bay wing on its right side, resting on a concrete foundation. The gable roof is clad in concrete barrel tile of the period. It was added to the National Register of Historic Places on April 12, 1989.

References

External links
 Sarasota County listings at National Register of Historic Places
 Sarasota County listings at Florida's Office of Cultural and Historical Programs

Houses on the National Register of Historic Places in Sarasota County, Florida
Houses completed in 1925
Mediterranean Revival architecture in Florida
1925 establishments in Florida
Venice, Florida